Coloma Township may refer to the following places in the United States:

 Coloma Township, Whiteside County, Illinois
 Coloma Charter Township, Michigan

Township name disambiguation pages